Kutaisi International University is a public research university in Kutaisi, Georgia. Its construction was announced on 12 September 2016 by Georgian prime minister Giorgi Kvirikashvili. The university opened officially on 21.10.2020 and offers educational programs leading to a Bachelor of Science in Management, Mathematics and Computer Science.

According to the Georgian Government it is planned that Kutaisi Technological University will be the largest, regional education and research hub in the Caucasus with modern university campus.

Kutaisi International University is developed through strategic partnership with Technical University of Munich (TUM). Cooperation’s scope includes academic and research programs as well as in its organizational structure and development plan. In 2020, TUM has opened an office in Georgia to further strengthen and support its partnership with Kutaisi International University. 

For 2021, KIU and TUM International intend to deepen their cooperation in particular in the field of technology transfer. TUM International Georgian office will help to develop the KIU campus into an international ecosystem for innovation and entrepreneurship. The office furthermore coordinates visits of scholars and lecturers to KIU and supports KIU’s outreach activities at national and international level. Like its TUM model, KIU will be building strong relationships with local and international companies to connect education, innovation and the labor market.

Organization 
As of 2023 Kutaisi International University offers four English-language education programs:

 Bachelor of Science in Management 
 Bachelor of Science in Mathematics
 Bachelor of Science in Computer Science
 Master of Science in Finance and Information Management

References 

Universities in Georgia (country)
Education in Kutaisi